The Halberstadt–Blankenburg railway is a non-electrified, single-track railway line, from Halberstadt via Langenstein and Börnecke to Blankenburg in the German state of Saxony-Anhalt. The Rübeland Railway connects to the line at Blankenburg (Harz) station. Until 1968, there was a branch to Derenburg. The branch line originally ran to Minsleben.

History 

Construction for the first section of the Halberstadt-Blankenburg Railway (Halberstadt-Blankenburger Eisenbahn, HBE) started on  28 July 1870 and the line was opened on 31 March 1873. A siding to the Blankenburg iron works, which was about 3 km-long, was opened on 12 July 1875. 

Since the operation as a main line incurred large operating expenses, the line was reclassified as a branch line in 1877. This allowed, among other things, numerous guards to be saved at level crossings.

Operations

Freight operations 
Freight traffic operates to the lime works over the Rübeland Railway. Until the power was removed from the Rübeland Railway’s overhead line in 2005, haulage of traffic in Blankenburg was changed from electric to Diesel locomotives, mostly of class  232 or class 241. These locomotives then took over the haulage to Halberstadt. To avoid the need to reverse in Blankenburg, a bypass curve exists north of the station.

Passenger services 
Passenger services run on the line every hour. After 1989, class 202 locomotives were often used for hauling passenger trains. From 2000, passenger trains from Halberstadt connected with services to Elbingerode on the Rübeland Railway, which ended in 2005. There were operated by push-pull trains, hauled by Class 218 diesel locomotives. Connex Sachsen Anhalt, now called Transdev Sachsen-Anhalt, took over operations in 2005. Alstom Coradia LINT diesel multiple units have since been used.

Peculiarity
A special feature of the line is that the tracks of the Halberstädter tramway are crossed twice in Halberstadt.

References

Footnotes

Sources

 

Railway lines in Saxony-Anhalt
Railway lines opened in 1873
1873 establishments in Germany
Buildings and structures in Harz (district)
Transport in the Harz